Lawrence William Kubin Jr. (born February 26, 1959) is a former American football linebacker who played in the National Football League (NFL) with the Washington Redskins from 1981 to 1984 (including two Super Bowls XVII and XVIII), and in 1985 with the Buffalo Bills and Tampa Bay Buccaneers. He played college football at Penn State University, where he set a new record of 30 sacks for Penn State.

Kubin played high school football at Union High School in Union, New Jersey.

References

1959 births
Living people
Washington Redskins players
Buffalo Bills players
Tampa Bay Buccaneers players
Penn State Nittany Lions football players
American football linebackers
People from Union Township, Union County, New Jersey
Players of American football from New Jersey
Sportspeople from the New York metropolitan area
Union High School (New Jersey) alumni